James H. McGillan (January 7, 1870 – March 7, 1935) was mayor of Green Bay, Wisconsin.

Biography
McGillan was born on January 7, 1870, in Appleton, Wisconsin. He attended Lawrence University and the University of Wisconsin Law School. Following graduation, he began practicing law in Marinette, Wisconsin, in 1891. He married Gertrude Sommerville on April 26, 1901. McGillan moved to Green Bay in 1900. During World War I, he served as an officer in the United States Navy. Following the war, he transferred to the United States Navy Reserve. He died from a myocardial infarction on March 7, 1935.

Political career
McGillan was mayor of Green Bay from 1927 to 1929. Previously, he had been city attorney of Marinette, district attorney of Marinette County, Wisconsin, and a state court judge. In 1928, he was a candidate for the United States House of Representatives from Wisconsin's 9th congressional district, losing to incumbent George J. Schneider. He was a Democrat.

References

Politicians from Appleton, Wisconsin
People from Marinette, Wisconsin
Mayors of Green Bay, Wisconsin
Wisconsin Democrats
Wisconsin state court judges
Wisconsin lawyers
Military personnel from Wisconsin
United States Navy officers
United States Navy personnel of World War I
Lawrence University alumni
University of Wisconsin Law School alumni
1870 births
1935 deaths